Janet Keeping was the Leader of the Green Party of Alberta, serving in this capacity from September 2012 to November 2017. Keeping was born in Montreal and has lived in Calgary since 1973.

She attended the Massachusetts Institute of Technology, earning a B.S. in architecture in 1971, and then studied environmental design. Keeping moved from Boston to Calgary in 1973 and earned a master's degree in philosophy prior to being admitted to the law school at the University of Calgary, where she graduated with a first law degree in 1981.

Keeping co-founded the Alberta Civil Liberties Research Centre where she was its first executive director and was, from 1984 to 2006, a Research Fellow at the Canadian Institute of Resources Law (CIRL), housed at The Faculty of Law, University of Calgary. While at CIRL Janet Keeping was Director of Russian Programs and led several studies funded by the Canadian International Development Agency in which she visited Russia and collaborated with Russian lawyers and scholars. Additionally, she was President of the Sheldon Chumir Foundation for Ethics in Leadership at the Centre for Constitutional Studies from 2006 to 2012.

Janet Keeping has lectured at The Faculty of Law, University of Calgary and was named honorary professor at the Faculty of Law, Tyumen State University during her time there as CIRL's Director of Russian Programs. In recognition of her legal work and scholarship, Keeping was awarded the Medal of Service by the Academic Council of Tomsk State University.

In September 2015, she was a by-election candidate in the district of Calgary-Foothills, but finished sixth with 3% of the vote. Keeping was endorsed as Leader of the Green Party of Alberta by Elizabeth May, the leader of the Green Party of Canada.

Janet Keeping lives in Calgary's Hillhurst community where she raised three children with her husband.

Election results

References

External links
Green Party of Alberta

Alberta Greens candidates in Alberta provincial elections
Living people
Year of birth missing (living people)
Leaders of the Green Party of Alberta (2011–present)
University of Calgary alumni
University of Calgary Faculty of Law alumni
MIT School of Architecture and Planning alumni
21st-century Canadian politicians